was a Japanese politician and Governor of the Bank of Japan from 1898 to 1903. He was also a member of the House of Peers and served as a cabinet minister in the pre-war government of the Empire of Japan.

Early life 
Yamamoto was born in Usuki Ōita Prefecture. He was the younger son of a samurai family of Usuki Domain.  After the Meiji Restoration, at 19 he moved to Osaka, and at 22 to Tokyo, where he studied at a school run by the Mitsubishi company.

Career
Yamamoto's first employment was as a teacher at the Osaka University of Commerce. At 26, he was appointed its principal.

In 1883, Yamamoto turned towards commerce, and obtained a position at the Mitsubishi-affiliated shipping firm Nippon Yusen, in which he rapidly rose through the corporate ranks. In 1890, he joined the Bank of Japan (BOJ), and in 1895 was appointed the chairman of the Yokohama Specie Bank. In April 1896, in order to better acquaint himself with issues pertaining to the gold standard, he travelled to England, and while still in England the following year, was appointed to the board of directors of the Bank of Japan. In October 1898, at the strong request of Bank of Japan governor Iwasaki Yasunosuke, he was recalled to Japan to assume the role of governor of the Bank of Japan. He had been with the Bank of Japan for eight years and was 43 years old at the time.

Yamamoto served as BOJ Governor from October 20, 1898, to October 19, 1903. During his tenure, the Japanese economy experienced various crisis pertaining to foreign exchange issues and the gold and silver standards. However, his greatest concern was the increasing budget deficits incurred by the Japanese government. As head of the Bank of Japan, Yamamoto refused to yield to political pressure from the Japanese Diet, the Cabinet, and the genrō to alter his fiscal policies. When political pressure was applied to his subordinates, causing eleven senior managers to resign in protest, Yamamoto used the opportunity to fill the positions with his supporters. Yamamoto’s actions were critical in preserving the future independence of the Bank of Japan from politics. In 1903, the combined efforts of Itō Hirobumi and Yamagata Aritomo managed to dislodge Yamamoto from his position. He was then appointed as a member of the House of Peers, and in 1909 became the head of Nippon Kangyō Ginkō.

In 1911, Prime Minister Saionji Kinmochi decided that he needed an expert in the field of finance to reform the Finance Ministry during his second cabinet, and appointed Yamamoto to become Finance Minister. This was the first time that a businessman had been selected to head a cabinet post, and set a precedent for selecting business executives to head ministries focused on economics or finance. However, with a looming financial crisis in the aftermath of the Russo-Japanese War, Yamamoto strongly opposed the Imperial Japanese Army’s demands for additional funding to support an increase in the number of infantry divisions. This issue led directly to the collapse of the Saionji cabinet in 1912. Afterwards, Yamamoto joined the Rikken Seiyūkai political party.

After the start of the Taishō period, during the 1st Yamamoto Gonnohyōe administration, Yamamoto was picked to become Minister of Agriculture and Commerce. Yamamoto also picked another former Bank of Japan governor, Takahashi Korekiyo, to head the Finance Ministry, hoping for a through fiscal revamp of the Japanese government. However, his cabinet was soon brought down by the Siemens scandal. Yamamoto returned again as Minister of Agriculture and Commerce under the subsequent Hara and Takahashi administrations from 1918 to 1922.

In 1925, Yamamoto joined the new Seiyūhontō party, along with Hatoyama Ichirō; however, the party failed to gain popular support and soon merged with the Kenseikai to form the Rikken Minseitō. However, as a former member of the rival Seiyūkai, Yamamoto found himself excluded from the highest ranks of the party leadership, and passed over for any important positions until 1932, when he was appointed as Home Minister under the Saitō Makoto administration in the aftermath of the March 15 incident. As Home Minister, he presided over a more severe interpretation of the Peace Preservation Laws.

Yamamoto continued to serve in the House of Peers until is dissolution by the post-war Constitution of Japan, and died in 1947 at the age of 91. His grave is at Aoyama Cemetery in Tokyo.

Notes

References

External links 
 Bank of Japan page on Yamamoto (in Japanese)

1856 births
1947 deaths
20th-century Japanese politicians
Ministers of Finance of Japan
Government ministers of Japan
Governors of the Bank of Japan
Members of the House of Peers (Japan)
Politicians from Ōita Prefecture
Rikken Minseitō politicians
Rikken Seiyūkai politicians
People from Usuki, Ōita